Gindou is a commune in the Lot department in south-western France.

References

See also
 Communes of the Lot department

Communes of Lot (department)